Fr. José Ignacio Cienfuegos Arteaga (October 1, 1762 – November 8, 1847) was a Chilean priest, Roman Catholic bishop of Concepción and political figure. He served twice as President of the Senate of Chile.

Cienfuegos was born in Santiago, the son of Francisco Cienfuegos and of Josefa Arteaga Martínez. He studied Theology at the Universidad Real de San Felipe and was later ordained as a priest in 1778. Cienfuegos became a Dominican friar and in 1790 was named priest of Talca, where he worked for 23 years. As such, he actively participated in the independence movement in Chile.

On October 9, 1813, he became a member of the Government Junta. During his term the junta adopted the national flag, founded the National institute of science and numerous primary schools throughout the country. In March 1814, Cienfuegos was elected titular member of the Consultive Senate of Chile. In 1814, after the battle of Rancagua, General Mariano Osorio deported him to the Juan Fernández Islands, where he remained for two years. He was allowed to return after the battle of Chacabuco in 1817. He was named administrator of the Santiago Cathedral in 1818 and participated in the formulation of the 1818 constitution. He was a member and President of the Conservative Senate of Chile between 1818 and 1820.

In 1821, Cienfuegos was sent to Rome as ambassador to try to negotiate the recognition of the Chilean independence. He returned to Chile in 1824 and became the Apostolic Administrator of the Santiago diocese while at the same time being one of the principal promoters of the Federalist attempt in Chile. In 1825 he became the President of the Provincial Assembly of Santiago and in 1826 participated in the constitutional congress as a deputy for Talca. Cienfuegos was returned as ambassador to the Holy See, where he was named titular Titular bishop of Retimo on December 15, 1828. He was elected Senator for Concepción on 1831, and again became President of the Conservative Senate of Chile between 1831 and 1834. On December 17, 1832, was named Bishop of Concepción.

On 1839 he resigned his bishopric and retired to the city of Talca, where he continue to work as a priest until his death on November 8, 1847, at the age of 85.

1762 births
1847 deaths
People from Santiago
Chilean people of Asturian descent
Chilean people of Basque descent
Roman Catholic bishops of Concepción
Presidents of the Senate of Chile
Members of the Chamber of Deputies of Chile
Senators of the III Legislative Period of the National Congress of Chile
19th-century Roman Catholic bishops in Chile